Presidential elections were held in Brazil on 1 March 1898. The result was a victory for Manuel Ferraz de Campos Sales of the Paulista Republican Party, who received 90.9% of the vote.

Results

References

Presidential elections in Brazil
Brazil
1898 in Brazil
March 1898 events
Election and referendum articles with incomplete results
Elections of the First Brazilian Republic